The following articles relate to Carbon dioxide accumulation in Earth's atmosphere:

Carbon dioxide in Earth's atmosphere
Global warming
Greenhouse effect